Zinc finger protein 384 is a protein that in humans is encoded by the ZNF384 gene.

Function 

This gene encodes a C2H2-type zinc finger protein, which may function as a transcription factor. This gene also contains long CAG trinucleotide repeats that encode consecutive glutamine residues. The protein appears to bind and regulate the promoters of the extracellular matrix genes MMP1, MMP3, MMP7 and COL1A1. Studies in mouse suggest that ZNF384 may be part of a general mechanical pathway that couples cell construction and function during extracellular matrix remodeling. Alternative splicing results in multiple transcript variants.

Clinical significance 

Recurrent rearrangements of this gene with the Ewing's sarcoma gene, EWSR1 on chromosome 22, or with the TAF15 gene on chromosome 17, or with the TCF3 (E2A) gene on chromosome 19, have been observed in acute leukemia.

References

Further reading

External links 
 

Transcription factors